Eratosphere is a free-to-join workshop for formal poetry. Additionally, it is a forum for free verse, for poetry and prose translation, fiction, art, literary criticism, and critical discussions on writing. It was founded in 1999 by Alexander Pepple as a workshop complement to Able Muse. Eratosphere moderators have included some of the best known formal poets, with the Poet Laureate of Wisconsin Marilyn Taylor, A. M. Juster, A. E. Stallings, and R. S. Gwynn among them.

The Distinguished Guest forum continues to host presentations and discussions with renowned writers and poets, such as former US Poet Laureate Richard Wilbur, the late Anthony Hecht, Timothy Steele, Charles Martin, and X. J. Kennedy. These discussions are permanently archived and accessible online. As such, it has been cited by academics and others as a reference (e.g., professor Susan Santovasi of Yale University on political poetry), whether to gauge poetic trends and beliefs or otherwise; it has been included in the listing of writing resources of several universities.

References

External links
Eratosphere website
Eratosphere Forums
Able Muse website
Listing at Airnyc 

Poetry movements
American literature websites
Writing
Writing circles
Formalism (aesthetics)
21st-century literature